The men's team épée fencing event at the 2017 Summer Universiade was held 24 August at the Taipei Nangang Exhibition Center in Taipei, Taiwan.

Seeds 
Since the number of individual épée event participants are 97, 98 will be the added number on those who did not participate in the individual event.

Ranking Round

Bronze Medal

Final ranking

Reference 

Fencing at the 2017 Summer Universiade